A-Sides is a compilation album by the American rock band Soundgarden with songs spanning the band's thirteen-year career. It was released on November 4, 1997, through A&M Records.

Overview
The album was released in 1997 on A&M Records and was Soundgarden's last official release for 13 years, until 2010's Telephantasm. It debuted at number 63 on the Billboard 200 album chart. A-Sides has sold over 500,000 copies in the United States according to Nielsen SoundScan and over 700,000 copies worldwide, but has not yet been certified by the RIAA. It peaked at number 51 on the UK Albums Chart, number 39 on the Australian Albums Chart, and number 6 on the New Zealand Albums Chart.

It contains one song absent from previous albums ("Bleed Together") which appeared on import copies of the "Burden in My Hand" single. The opening track "Nothing to Say" was originally not an A-side. It appeared as the B-side to the band's first single "Hunted Down" on Sub Pop in 1987. In addition, "Get on the Snake" from Louder Than Love was released as a promo-only single in 1989. Also, the 1990 Sub Pop single "Room a Thousand Years Wide" does not appear on A-Sides, nor the 1994 single "My Wave" from Superunknown.

AllMusic staff writer Stephen Thomas Erlewine gave the album four and a half out of five stars. He said, "For an act that was one of the definitive album artists of the late '80s and '90s, Soundgarden was a surprisingly effective singles band. Their singles effectively conveyed all of their best ideas, from their sludgy early Sub Pop recordings to the elaborate, post-metal psychedelia of their last two albums, Superunknown and Down on the Upside. That's the reason why the 17-track compilation A-Sides is such a successful overview of the band's too-brief career." Entertainment Weekly reviewer David Browne gave the album an A. He said, "Pruning their best early songwriting ("Hands All Over", "Nothing to Say") and wisely highlighting chunks of their last two (and best) albums, A-Sides presents the band in all its evolving, bridling-horses glory and thunder. When all those Hanson fans grow up and want to educate themselves on the flannel era they missed, here's where they should turn."

Following Chris Cornell's death in May 2017, A-Sides re-entered the Australian albums chart at number 47. On Record Store Day 2018, A-Sides was released on double green translucent vinyl.

Track listing
All lyrics and music written by Chris Cornell, except where noted.

Personnel
Soundgarden
Matt Cameron – drums
Chris Cornell – lead vocals, rhythm guitar
Ben Shepherd – bass on tracks 6–17
Kim Thayil – lead guitar
Hiro Yamamoto – bass on tracks 1–5

Production

Nelson Ayres, John Jackson – mixing assistance
Michael Barbiero, Brendan O'Brien, Ron Saint Germain, Steve Thompson – mixing
Matt Bayles, Stuart Hallerman, Efren Herrera, Sam Hofstedt – assistant engineering
Michael Beinhorn – production
Larry Brewer – production assistance
John Burton, Tom Smurdon – additional tracking assistance
Drew Canulette – production, engineering
Dave Collins, Howie Weinberg – mastering
Jason Corsaro, Lance Limbocker – engineering
Terry Date – production, engineering
Jack Endino – production, engineering, assistant engineering
Larimie Garcia, Steve Gilbert, Michael Lavine, Jan Van Oldenmark, Charles Peterson, Mark Seliger, Kevin Westenberg – photography
Adam Kasper – assistant engineering, mixing assistance, co-production, engineering, mixing
Oogie – art direction and design
Soundgarden – production, mixing

Charts and certifications

Album

Singles

Certifications

References

1997 greatest hits albums
Soundgarden compilation albums
A&M Records compilation albums
Albums produced by Adam Kasper
Albums produced by Michael Beinhorn
Albums produced by Terry Date
Alternative metal compilation albums
Albums produced by Chris Cornell
Albums produced by Matt Cameron
Albums produced by Jack Endino